The Sri Lanka Railways Class M5 is a type of diesel-electric locomotive. The class was ordered to strengthen the diesel locomotive fleet of Sri Lanka Railways.

The Class M5 became a familiar sight on Main Line of SLR. They performed on Sri Lanka's railroad for few years.

History

Background 
In order to replace steam locomotives and also to increase the diesel locomotive fleet of SLR, 16 diesel-electric locomotives were ordered from Hitachi and were delivered in 1979.

Decline 
After few years of operation, due to technical problems, M5 class locomotives were taken out of service.

Sub-Classes
Considering the decline of original Class M5 locomotives, SLR refurbished some selected M5 locomotives as a part of the Transportation Rehabilitation Project. Refurbished locomotives were allocated in to 3 classes namely, M5A, M5B and M5C.

Incidents
Locomotives 773 and 780 were damaged due to accidents. Both are out of service. The last M5C locomotive was released in 2010. This locomotive was fitted with air brakes.

See also
Diesel locomotives of Sri Lanka

References

Diesel-electric locomotives of Sri Lanka
5 ft 6 in gauge locomotives
Railway locomotives introduced in 1979
Hitachi locomotives